Flaka Surroi (born 1964) is a notable Kosovo-Albanian publisher. She comes from the family of Kosovo politician and diplomat Rexhai Surroi, and is a sibling of Veton Surroi, a Kosovan politician. She finished her high school in Mexico, where her father was serving as an ambassador, and graduated at University of Pristina.

Before the Kosovo war of 1999, Surroi has worked in several international NGOs, while after the war she led a local foundation. She worked for a short period of time as Permanent Secretary of the Prime Minister of Kosovo, but after the re-entrance of her brother Veton Surroi into politics in 2003, Flaka Surroi took the helm and sole ownership, of the family enterprise Koha Group, that consists of a national TV broadcaster called Kohavision, the biggest daily newspaper in Kosovo Koha Ditore (Daily Time), Printing press, an Internet Service Provider Koha Net and a winery business. She has recently (2013) heavily supported protests against the Government of Kosovo as being "thieves" and has promoted herself as an advocate of gender equality.

During her tenure as the head of Koha Ditore, the company has kept the leading position in Kosovo market.

References

20th-century Albanian women
21st-century Albanian women
Albanian publishers (people)
Kosovan publishers (people)
Kosovo Albanians
Living people
1964 births